Sundakhar (also Romanized as Sūndākhar; also known as Sindākhir, Sindakhyr, Sondākhvor, Sondeh Khor, Sowndeh Khvor, Sūnd Ākhowr, Sūndākhūr, and Sūndeh Khūr) is a village in Dizmar-e Markazi Rural District, Kharvana District, Varzaqan County, East Azerbaijan Province, Iran. At the 2006 census, its population was 107, in 24 families.

References 

Towns and villages in Varzaqan County